Taye Ashby-Hammond (born 21 March 1999) is an English professional footballer who plays for Stevenage, on loan from Fulham, as a goalkeeper.

Club career
Born in Richmond, London, Ashby-Hammond began his career with Fulham, spending time on loan at non-league clubs Chipstead, Maidenhead United, and Boreham Wood. At Boreham Wood he was "an integral part in the National League team's impressive run to the Fifth Round of the FA Cup".

He signed on loan for Stevenage in June 2022, becoming the club's ninth signing of the transfer window.

International career
Ashby-Hammond has been capped by England at under-16 and under-17 levels.

Personal life
Ashby-Hammond has a brother, Luca, who also plays as a goalkeeper for Fulham.

Career statistics

References

1999 births
Living people
English footballers
England youth international footballers
Fulham F.C. players
Chipstead F.C. players
Maidenhead United F.C. players
Boreham Wood F.C. players
Stevenage F.C. players
Association football goalkeepers
Isthmian League players
National League (English football) players
English Football League players